António Reymão Nogueira (6 November 1909 – 9 June 1987) was a Portuguese equestrian. He competed at the 1952 Summer Olympics and the 1960 Summer Olympics.

References

External links
 

1909 births
1987 deaths
Portuguese male equestrians
Portuguese dressage riders
Olympic equestrians of Portugal
Equestrians at the 1952 Summer Olympics
Equestrians at the 1960 Summer Olympics
Sportspeople from Lisbon